The Blazers is a rock and roll, blues and Latin alternative band, based out of East Los Angeles.

Original band members were Manuel Gonzales, Ruben Guaderrama, Ruben Gonzalez and Lee Stuart. Current members: Ruben Guaderrama, and Raul Medrano. Ruben Gonzalez, Lee Stuart, Jesus Cuevas, Mike Molina and Manuel Gonzales all were formerly members of the band, but left to pursue their own music. Cuevas left the band to play more accordion. He would later join Cali-Mex band Los Fabulocos.

They are signed to Rounder Records, but they have released albums through CRS Records Ltd and Little Dog Records.

INTRO AND HISTORY

Both Manuel Gonzales and Ruben Guaderrama were the original founding members of the Blazers and were the core of the group as it was always tough to find band members that would were dedicated. As lifelong friends from their early school days in (Theodore Roosevelt High School) in the City of Boyle Heights in East Los Angeles. Both Manuel and Ruben grew up on the rough streets of East Los Angeles and because of their mutual love of music that strengthen them they became influential musicians for those inspiring young musicians that grew up in the same conditions. The Blazers influenced many local bands like (La Terra etc.) and help create that unique soulful sound of Mexican American Rock n Roll we call East Side Soul also known as Chicano Rock that we know today. Pioneered by famous groups like Los Lobos. (Cesar) of Los Lobos saw this talent and potential that The Blazers had and not only inspired them but produce their first two records Short Fuse and East Side Soul.

Members

Current members
 Ruben Guaderrama - vocals, guitar
 Raul Medrano - drums

Former members
 Lee Stuart - bass 
 Ruben Gonzalez - guitar
 Jesus Cuevas - accordion, vocals
 Mike Molina - drums
 Manuel Gonzales - vocals, guitar

Discography
 Short Fuse (1994) 
 East Side Soul (1995) 
 Going Up The Country (1996)
 Just For You (1997) 
 Puro Blazers (2000) 
 The Seventeen Jewels (2003)  
 Dreaming a Dream (2008)

Links
 The Blazers at Discogs.com

References

External links
 

Musical groups from Los Angeles
Tejano music groups